Prokopov, female form Prokopova, is a Russian surname.

Notable people
Notable people having this surname include:
 Ludmila Prokopová (1888–1959), Czech-Bulgarian pianist
 Svitlana Prokopova (born 1993), Ukrainian rhythmic gymnast
 Valentin Prokopov (born 1929), Russian water polo player 
 Yevgeniy Prokopov (born 1950), Ukrainian sculptor

References